The following lists events that happened during 2015 in Saint Vincent and the Grenadines.

Incumbents
Monarch: Elizabeth II
Governor General: Frederick Ballantyne 
Prime Minister: Ralph Gonsalves

Events

January
 January 12 - A school bus plunges off of a cliff on St. Vincent leaving at least five people dead and two missing.

References

 
Years of the 21st century in Saint Vincent and the Grenadines
2010s in Saint Vincent and the Grenadines
Saint Vincent and the Grenadines
Saint Vincent and the Grenadines